Bradford County Airport  is a public airport  south of Towanda, a borough in and the county seat of Bradford County, Pennsylvania. It is owned by the Bradford County Airport Authority.

Facilities
In the year ending September 30, 2006 the airport had 23,100 aircraft operations, average 63 per day: 99.6% general aviation and 0.4% military.

References

External links
 Bradford County Airport (N27) at Pennsylvania DOT Bureau of Aviation

Airports in Pennsylvania
County airports in Pennsylvania
Transportation buildings and structures in Bradford County, Pennsylvania